Estonia 200 (E200) is a liberal political party in Estonia. It adheres to social and economic liberalism.

History 
In 2017, the initiators of the movement began discussing Estonia's future. The movement's formal foundation arguably took place on 2 May 2018, when their manifesto was first published. According to a mid-June 2018 poll conducted by Turu-uuringute AS, 15% of voters were ready to vote for the movement in the 2019 parliamentary elections. 

On 30 May 2018, former Põlva County governor Igor Taro was appointed rural area coordinator of the movement. On 7 June, the initiators announced that Henrik Raave would lead Eesti 200, and the following day, the manifesto authors registered it as a nonprofit organisation. Its founders were Raave, Taro, as well as Priit Alamäe, Kristiina Tõnnisson, Indrek Nuume and Kristina Kallas, who was elected council head. On 7 August, news broke that Margus Tsahkna, former leader of the Pro Patria party, was set to join Eesti 200.

On 21 August 2018, the Estonia 200 movement decided to form a party later that fall and participate in the March 2019 parliamentary elections. On 3 November, the day the movement became a party, Kristina Kallas was elected as its first chairperson. On 15 May 2019, Triin Saag told Europe Elects that E200 aimed to join what would become the liberal Renew Europe group in the EU Parliament.

In July 2020, Karin Kaup Lapõnin became Estonia 200's executive secretary. On 10 October, the party elected a new board, with Kallas reelected as chair. Kaup Lapõnin, Margot Roose, Lauri Hussar and Marek Reinaas were elected as board members, while Margus Tsahkna, Pirko Konsa and Jaak Laineste were reelected to the board. On 15 October 2022, Hussar defeated Kallas in the party's leadership election and became chair.

In the 2023 parliamentary election, Estonia 200 received 13.3% of the vote and 14 seats in the Riigikogu. Following the election on 7 March, Prime Minister and Reform Party leader Kaja Kallas invited Estonia 200 and the Social Democratic Party for preliminary talks aimed at forming a new coalition government.

Ideology and platform 
Estonia 200 describes itself as a liberal and progressive party. It supports Estonia's NATO and European Union membership, same-sex marriage and internet access as a human right. It also supports reducing the personal income tax rate of employees with places of work and residence outside Tallinn and Harju County by 15%. The party supports community-based renewable energy sources and creating a bond for green funding. It advocates the inclusion of mental health lessons in school curricula, as well as reserving 1% of local budgets for investment projects chosen by residents. Estonia 200 also calls for local government bodies to be made up of 50% politicians and 50% representatives of experts and interest groups. In addition, it intends to decrease public funding for all political parties.

Election results

Parliamentary elections

European Parliament elections

Notes

References

Centrist parties in Estonia
Liberal parties in Estonia
Political parties in Estonia
Political parties established in 2018
2018 establishments in Estonia